Robert Honywood  may refer to:

 Robert Honywood (New Romney MP) (1601–1686), MP for New Romney
 Robert Honywood (Essex MP) (died 1735), MP for Essex
 Robert Honywood (cricketer) (1825–1870), of Marks Hall in Essex, son of William Philip Honywood, cricketer

See also
Robert Honiwood,  Canon of Windsor from 1504 to 1523
Honywood (surname)